Homer's Fort was a French and Indian War era stockade fort erected by settlers five miles upstream on the Cacapon River from Fort Edwards near present-day Hooks Mills in Hampshire County, West Virginia, United States. Historically, Homer's Fort was also referred to as Fort MacKay. Some sources suggest that the name Homer's fort might have been another name for a fortification at Friend Cox's at the mouth of the Little Cacapon River.

See also
 List of historic sites in Hampshire County, West Virginia

References

Forts in Hampshire County, West Virginia
Landmarks in West Virginia
French and Indian War forts
Colonial forts in West Virginia